Alagón is a municipality located in the province of Zaragoza, Aragon, Spain. According to the 2009 census (INE), the municipality has a population of 7195 inhabitants.

Notable people 
 Jesús Angoy, (born 22 May 1966) is a Spanish retired association football goalkeeper, who also played as a placekicker in American football.

See also
List of municipalities in Zaragoza

References

Municipalities in the Province of Zaragoza